Kâni Karaca (1930 – May 29, 2004) was a Turkish singer. Born in Adana, Turkey, he lost his eyesight at the age of 2 and memorized the Quran in elementary school. He came to Istanbul in 1950. He worked with Sadettin Heper, and learned religious and nonreligious music from him.

He died from cancer at the age of 74, in Istanbul.

Recordings
 Kalan Müzik

External links
 

1930 births
2004 deaths
Blind musicians
Deaths from cancer in Turkey
Musicians of Ottoman classical music
Musicians of Turkish makam music
20th-century Turkish male singers